City Hall, London may refer to:
City Hall, London (Newham), a building in Newham that has been the headquarters of the Greater London Authority since 2022
City Hall, London (Southwark), a building in Southwark that was the headquarters of the Greater London Authority between 2002 and 2021
City Hall is a metonym for the Greater London Authority, the devolved administration that occupies the building